Loch Spey is a small freshwater loch located in the Central Highlands of Scotland. This loch is significant because it forms the headwaters of the powerful River Spey.

The loch has native fish, including trout and minnows.

References 
 Spey Fishery Board

External links 
 Loch Spey Weather
 Geograph

Badenoch and Strathspey
Spey
Spey